Egg drop can refer any one of the following things:

Egg drop competition, an experiment usually performed by students.
Egg drop soup, a Chinese soup dish.
Eggdrop, a popular IRC bot.
Egg Drop, an episode of the television series Modern Family
Egg drop syndrome or EDS, a bird disease caused by an avian adenovirus
Egg dropping puzzle, a popular problem in mathematics and computer science